Out of the Blue is a British television crime drama series, set and filmed in Sheffield, and broadcast on BBC One between 23 May 1995, and 9 September 1996. A total of twelve episodes were broadcast across two series. John Hannah and David Morrissey starred as the main protagonists in each respective series. Out of the Blue follows a team of detectives at Brazen Gate CID through grisly murder cases, clashes with an already-divided community and through the dramas of their personal lives. The series ultimately received acclaim from critics, but did not pull in the expected viewing figures, and was subsequently axed after the second series. The complete series is due for release on DVD by Simply Media 10 July 2017.

Out of the Blue was billed as a "hard-hitting police drama", and was noted as the BBC's second attempt to rival The Bill following Waterfront Beat. Series script editor Claire Elliot said of the series; "[Out of the Blue] is a contemporary, gritty, urban reality. It's tight script, fast-paced direction and strong cast make for powerful and compulsive viewing". The series was shot entirely on film. At the time, the BBC also described the series as "the British answer to Homicide: Life on the Street". The lack of viewers for the series, which led to its untimely demise, was blamed on the fact that "viewers at the time seemed uncomfortable with the hand held camera work and bleak Yorkshire back drop." Writers Bill Gallagher and Peter Bowker said at the time that they were "more interested in character development than plot". However, the series was acclaimed for dealing with strong topics including male rape and euthanasia.

Plot
Ambitious DS Franky Drinkall (John Hannah)'s life is turned upside down when he is diagnosed with epilepsy. His refusal to accept his condition leads him into a downward spiral and ultimately to his demise. DS Rebecca Bennett (Orla Brady) gives an ever-present emotional charge as she finds herself the subject of both PC Alex Holder (Stephen Billington)'s and DC Warren Allen (Darrell D'Silva)'s affections. DC Marty Brazil (Neil Dudgeon) is the joker of the group. The second season sees the arrival of troubled DS Jim Llewyn (David Morrissey), who seems to be working to his own agenda.

Cast
 John Duttine as DI Eric Temple (Series 1–2)
 Orla Brady as DS Rebecca "Becky" Bennett (Series 1–2)
 John Hannah as DS Franky Drinkall (Series 1)
 David Morrissey as DS Jim Llewyn (Series 2)
 Darrell D'Silva as DC Warren Allen (Series 1–2)
 Neil Dudgeon as DC Marty Brazil (Series 1–2)
 Andy Rashleigh as DC Tony Bromley (Series 1–2)
 Lennie James as DC Bruce Hannaford (Series 1–2)
 Peter Wight as DC Ron Ludlow (Series 1–2)
 Stephen Billington as PC Alex Holder (Series 1)
 Pauline Black as Dr Innocent Adesigbin (Series 1)

Episodes

Series 1 (1995)

Series 2 (1996)

References

External links
 
 

BBC television dramas
1995 British television series debuts
1996 British television series endings
1990s British drama television series
Television shows set in Sheffield
British crime drama television series
English-language television shows
Serial drama television series